Esteem may refer to:

 Esteem (album), by Machinations, 1983
 ESTEEM Program, at University of Notre Dame
 ESteem, modeling company which partnered with SM Entertainment to form ESteem Entertainment
 ESteem Entertainment, SM Entertainment partnered with modeling company ESteem
 Optare Esteem, a British bus
 Suzuki Esteem, a compact car
 USS Esteem (AM-438), a minesweeper 
 Respect, also called esteem

See also

 Self-esteem
 Maslow's hierarchy of needs